Svetilnoye is a rural locality (a selo) in Seletkansky Selsoviet of Shimanovsky District, Amur Oblast, Russia. The population was 97 as of 2018. There are 3 streets.

Geography 
Svetilnoye is located on the Bolshaya Pyora River, 17 km southeast of Shimanovsk (the district's administrative centre) by road. Seletkan is the nearest rural locality.

References 

Rural localities in Shimanovsky District